Philipp Walsleben (born November 19, 1987) is a German former racing cyclist, who rode professionally in cyclo-cross and road racing between 2006 and 2021 for the Team Notebooksbilliger.de, Heinz Von Heiden–Focus and  teams. During his cyclo-cross career, Walsleben won the world under-23 title in 2009 and the German national title on six occasions.

Major results
Source:

Cyclo-cross

2002–2003
 2nd National Debutants Championships
2004–2005
 1st  National Junior Championships
2006–2007
 1st  National Under-23 Championships
2007–2008
 1st Memorial Romano Scotti, UCI Under-23 World Cup
 Under-23 Superprestige
1st Cyclo-cross Gavere
1st Superprestige Gieten
 2nd  UEC European Under-23 Championships
2008–2009
 1st  Under-23 race, UCI World Championships
 1st  UEC European Under-23 Championships
 1st  National Championships
 1st  Overall UCI Under-23 World Cup
1st Cyklokros Tábor
1st Veldrit Pijnacker
1st Grand Prix Eric De Vlaeminck
1st Cyclo-cross Grand Prix Lille Métropole
 1st Overall Under-23 Superprestige
1st Cyclo-cross Ruddervoorde
1st Cyclo-cross Gavere
1st Bollekescross
1st Superprestige Diegem
1st Vlaamse Aardbeiencross
1st Cyclo-cross Vorselaar
 1st Overall Under-23 Gazet van Antwerpen
1st Koppenbergcross
1st Grand Prix van Hasselt
1st Grand Prix Rouwmoer
1st Grand Prix Sven Nys
2nd Krawatencross
 1st Frankfurter Rad-Cross
 1st Stevens Cyclo-cross Cup
 1st Cross im Park
2009–2010
 1st  National Championships
 1st Internationaler Rad-Cross
2010–2011
 1st  National Championships
 5th Elite race, UCI World Championships
 8th Overall UCI World Cup
2011–2012
 2nd National Championships
 9th Elite race, UCI World Championships
2012–2013
 1st  National Championships
 5th Elite race, UCI World Championships
2013–2014
 1st  National Championships
 1st Süpercross Baden
 1st Internationale Cyclo-Cross Rucphen
 2nd Overall UCI World Cup
2nd Cyklokros Tábor
3rd Caubergcross
3rd Duinencross Koksijde
3rd Grand Prix Nommay
2014–2015
 9th Elite race, UCI World Championships
2015–2016
 1st  National Championships
2016–2017
 3rd National Championships
2017–2018
 1st Cyklokros Slaný, Toi Toi Cup

Road

2006
 1st Young rider classification Course de Solidarność et des Champions Olympiques
2008
 1st Stage 3 Tour de la Province de Namur
2009
 10th Overall Boucles de la Mayenne
2011
 1st Stage 3 Mi-Août en Bretagne
2013
 1st  Overall Baltic Chain Tour
1st Stage 1
 3rd Overall Tour Alsace
1st  Points classification
1st Stage 3
2014
 Tour Alsace
1st Combativity classification
1st Km 68 classification
2015
 1st  Combativity classification Tour of Belgium
 2nd Circuit de Wallonie
 7th Overall Tour Alsace
 8th Grand Prix Pino Cerami
2016
 1st  Mountains classification Czech Cycling Tour
2017
 1st  Mountains classification Tour du Limousin
2018
 1st  Overall Bałtyk–Karkonosze Tour
1st Stage 3
2019
 4th Paris–Chauny
2021
 1st Stage 4 Arctic Race of Norway
 2nd Overall Boucles de la Mayenne
1st Stage 1

References

External links
  
 
 

1987 births
Living people
German male cyclists
Cyclo-cross cyclists
Sportspeople from Potsdam
People from Bezirk Potsdam
Cyclists from Brandenburg